is a retired Japanese professional mixed martial artist. A professional competitor from 2001 until 2012, Mitsuoka fought for the UFC, DREAM, World Victory Road, PRIDE, Shooto, Cage Force, DEEP and King of the Cage promotions. Mitsuoka's nickname , which translates as "The Heaven-sent Child of the Cage" was given in reference to his earlier career in King of the Cage and his performance in Cage Force.

Mixed martial arts career

Ultimate Fighting Championship
Mitsuoka made his UFC debut replacing an injured George Sotiropoulos against Takanori Gomi on February 26, 2012 at UFC 144. He lost the fight via TKO in the second round.

Mitsuoka faced Nik Lentz in his Featherweight debut on August 11, 2012 at UFC 150. He lost the fight via first round TKO and was subsequently released from the promotion.

Mixed martial arts record

|-
| Loss
| align=center| 18–9–2
| Nik Lentz
| TKO (punches)
| UFC 150
| 
| align=center| 1
| align=center| 3:45
| Denver, Colorado, United States
| 
|-
| Loss
| align=center| 18–8–2
| Takanori Gomi
| TKO (punches)
| UFC 144
| 
| align=center| 2
| align=center| 2:21
| Saitama, Japan
| 
|-
| Win
| align=center| 18–7–2
| Bruno Carvalho
| Decision (unanimous)
| Dream: Japan GP Final
| 
| align=center| 2
| align=center| 5:00
| Tokyo, Japan
| 
|-
| Win
| align=center| 17–7–2
| Jung Gyeong Lee
| Submission (punches)
| Deep: 53 Impact
| 
| align=center| 1
| align=center| 3:50
| Tokyo, Japan
| 
|-
| Loss
| align=center| 16–7–2
| Kazunori Yokota
| Decision (unanimous)
| World Victory Road Presents: Sengoku 11
| 
| align=center| 3
| align=center| 5:00
| Tokyo, Japan
| 
|-
| Win
| align=center| 16–6–2
| Clay French
| Submission (guillotine choke)
| World Victory Road Presents: Sengoku 9
| 
| align=center| 1
| align=center| 1:51
| Saitama, Saitama, Japan
| 
|-
| Win
| align=center| 15–6–2
| Sergey Golyaev
| Submission (armbar)
| World Victory Road Presents: Sengoku no Ran 2009
| 
| align=center| 1
| align=center| 4:22
| Saitama, Saitama, Japan
| 
|-
| Loss
| align=center| 14–6–2
| Satoru Kitaoka
| Submission (heel hook)
| World Victory Road Presents: Sengoku 6
| 
| align=center| 1
| align=center| 1:16
| Saitama, Saitama, Japan
| 
|-
| Win
| align=center| 14–5–2
| Rodrigo Damm
| Submission (rear-naked choke)
| World Victory Road Presents: Sengoku 4
| 
| align=center| 1
| align=center| 3:13
| Saitama, Saitama, Japan
| 
|-
| Win
| align=center| 13–5–2
| Kwang Hee Lee
| Submission (rear-naked choke)
| World Victory Road Presents: Sengoku 2
| 
| align=center| 1
| align=center| 4:15
| Tokyo, Japan
| 
|-
| Win
| align=center| 12–5–2
| Joachim Hansen
| Decision (majority)
| Shooto: Back To Our Roots 6
| 
| align=center| 3
| align=center| 5:00
| Tokyo, Japan
| 
|-
| Loss
| align=center| 11–5–2
| Kotetsu Boku
| Decision (unanimous)
| GCM: Cage Force 4
| 
| align=center| 3
| align=center| 5:00
| Tokyo, Japan
| 
|-
| Win
| align=center| 11–4–2
| Takumi Nakayama
| TKO (punches)
| GCM: Cage Force 3
| 
| align=center| 1
| align=center| 3:30
| Tokyo, Japan
| 
|-
| Win
| align=center| 10–4–2
| Brian Cobb
| Submission (guillotine choke)
| GCM: Cage Force 2
| 
| align=center| 3
| align=center| 1:38
| Tokyo, Japan
| 
|-
| Win
| align=center| 9–4–2
| Danilo Zanolini
| Submission (armbar)
| GCM: Cage Force 1
| 
| align=center| 1
| align=center| 1:23
| Tokyo, Japan
| 
|-
| Win
| align=center| 8–4–2
| Paul Rodriguez
| Submission (guillotine choke)
| GCM: D.O.G. 7
| 
| align=center| 2
| align=center| 0:40
| Tokyo, Japan
| 
|-
| Loss
| align=center| 7–4–2
| Vítor Ribeiro
| Decision (unanimous)
| MARS
| 
| align=center| 3
| align=center| 5:00
| Tokyo, Japan
|150 lbs bout.
|-
| Win
| align=center| 7–3–2
| Samy Schiavo
| Submission (rear naked choke)
| GCM: D.O.G. 3
| 
| align=center| 1
| align=center| 2:12
| Tokyo, Japan
| 
|-
| Loss
| align=center| 6–3–2
| Nick Agallar
| Decision (unanimous)
| GCM: D.O.G. 2
| 
| align=center| 3
| align=center| 5:00
| Tokyo, Japan
| 
|-
| Win
| align=center| 6–2–2
| Shigetoshi Iwase
| TKO (punches)
| GCM: Demolition 040919
| 
| align=center| 1
| align=center| 4:16
| Tokyo, Japan
| 
|-
| Draw
| align=center| 5–2–2
| Kyosuke Sasaki
| Draw
| PRIDE Bushido 4
| 
| align=center| 2
| align=center| 5:00
| Aichi Prefecture, Japan
|Return to Lightweight (160 lbs).
|-
| Loss
| align=center| 5–2–1
| Chris Brennan
| Submission (kimura)
| PRIDE Bushido 1
| 
| align=center| 1
| align=center| 4:31
| Saitama, Saitama, Japan
|
|-
| Win
| align=center| 5–1–1
| Gleison Tibau
| TKO (corner stoppage)
| DEEP: 11th Impact
| 
| align=center| 2
| align=center| 3:41
| Osaka, Japan
| 
|-
| Win
| align=center| 4–1–1
| Zuli Silawanto
| Submission (rear naked choke)
| TPI Fighting Championship 11
| 
| align=center| 1
| align=center| 1:43
| Indonesia
| 
|-
| Win
| align=center| 3–1–1
| Scott Bills
| Decision (unanimous)
| PRIDE FC: The Best, Vol. 3
| 
| align=center| 2
| align=center| 5:00
| Tokyo, Japan
| 
|-
| Loss
| align=center| 2–1–1
| John Alessio
| TKO (cut)
| PRIDE The Best Vol.2
| 
| align=center| 2
| align=center| 3:13
| Tokyo, Japan
| 
|-
| Win
| align=center| 2–0–1
| Anthony Macias
| Decision (unanimous)
| PRIDE The Best Vol.1
| 
| align=center| 2
| align=center| 5:00
| Tokyo, Japan
| 
|-
| Draw
| align=center| 1–0–1
| Betiss Mansouri
| Draw
| KOTC 11: Domination
| 
| align=center| 3
| align=center| 5:00
| San Jacinto, California, United States
| |
|-
| Win
| align=center| 1–0
| Gerald Strebendt
| TKO (submission to punches)
| KOTC 9: Showtime
| 
| align=center| 1
| align=center| 2:23
| San Jacinto, California, United States
|

References

External links
 
 

Living people
1976 births
Japanese male mixed martial artists
Lightweight mixed martial artists
Mixed martial artists utilizing wrestling
Mixed martial artists utilizing Brazilian jiu-jitsu
Japanese practitioners of Brazilian jiu-jitsu
Japanese male sport wrestlers
People from Handa, Aichi
Sportspeople from Aichi Prefecture
Wajitsu Keishukai
Featherweight mixed martial artists
Ultimate Fighting Championship male fighters